Daniel Gramatikov (born 9 March 1989) is a Bulgarian footballer who currently plays as a defender for Chernomorets Balchik.

References

External links
 

1989 births
Living people
Bulgarian footballers
PFC Cherno More Varna players
FC Chernomorets Balchik players
PFC Ludogorets Razgrad players
FC Costuleni players
PFC Svetkavitsa players
PFC Lokomotiv Plovdiv players
PFC Dobrudzha Dobrich players
First Professional Football League (Bulgaria) players
Expatriate footballers in Moldova
Sportspeople from Varna, Bulgaria
Association football central defenders